Franco Ongarato (born 29 May 1949) is a former Italian road cyclist. As an amateur he competed at the 1972 Olympics, and won two stages of the Tour of Bulgaria in 1970 and one stage of the Tour de l'Avenir in 1972. In 1973–74 he rode professionally and took part in the 1973 Giro d'Italia, placing third in stage 9.

References

External links
 

1949 births
Living people
Italian male cyclists
Olympic cyclists of Italy
Cyclists at the 1972 Summer Olympics
Sportspeople from Padua
Cyclists from the Province of Padua